Benzodioxine may refer to:

 1,2-Benzodioxine
 1,3-Benzodioxine
 1,4-Benzodioxine
 2,3-Benzodioxine